Osborne Llewellyn Timmons (born September 18, 1970), is an American former Major League Baseball (MLB) outfielder and current coach with the Milwaukee Brewers.

Playing career
Timmons attended Brandon High School in Brandon, Florida, and the University of Tampa, where he played college baseball for the Tampa Spartans. In 1990, he played collegiate summer baseball with the Falmouth Commodores of the Cape Cod Baseball League. He was selected by the Chicago Cubs in the fifth round of the 1991 MLB draft.

Timmons made his MLB debut with the Cubs on April 26, 1995. The Cubs traded Timmons and Jay Peterson to the Cincinnati Reds for Curt Lyons on March 31, 1997. He signed with the Seattle Mariners for the 1999 season, the Tampa Bay Devil Rays for the 2000 season, and was purchased by the Chunichi Dragons of Nippon Professional Baseball's Central League for the 2001 season.

Coaching career
He served as the hitting coach for the Tampa Bay Rays‘ Triple-A affiliate Durham Bulls, prior to being promoted to the parent-club Rays, as their first base coach, for the  season.

After the 2021 season, the Milwaukee Brewers hired Timmons and Connor Dawson as their hitting coaches.

References

External links

1970 births
Living people
Acereros de Monclova players
African-American baseball coaches
African-American baseball players
American expatriate baseball players in Japan
American expatriate baseball players in Mexico
Atlantic City Surf players
Baseball coaches from Florida
Baseball players from Tampa, Florida
Broncos de Reynosa players
Caribes de Oriente players
Chicago Cubs players
Chunichi Dragons players
Cincinnati Reds players
Criollos de Caguas players
Durham Bulls players
El Paso Diablos players
Falmouth Commodores players
Geneva Cubs players
Indianapolis Indians players
Iowa Cubs players
Leones del Caracas players
Liga de Béisbol Profesional Roberto Clemente outfielders
Major League Baseball first base coaches
Major League Baseball outfielders
Mexican League baseball left fielders
Mexican League baseball right fielders
Minor league baseball coaches
Navegantes del Magallanes players
American expatriate baseball players in Venezuela
Nippon Professional Baseball first basemen
Nippon Professional Baseball outfielders
Norfolk Tides players
Orlando Cubs players
Piratas de Campeche players
Richmond Braves players
Seattle Mariners players
Tacoma Rainiers players
Tampa Bay Devil Rays players
Tampa Bay Rays coaches
Tampa Spartans baseball players
Tigres de Aragua players
Winston-Salem Spirits players
21st-century African-American sportspeople
20th-century African-American sportspeople